MV Skorpios II is a Chile-registered cruise ship owned and operated by Cruceros Skorpios. The ship was built in 1988 on Skorpios, Chile shipyards under SOLAS and IMO regulations and under the ABS (American Bureau of Shipping), Class Nr 890.56.66, A1 ice. Its remodeled in equipment cabins, bathrooms and dining 2010. It has certificate of registration number 2567 of the Directorate General of Maritime Territory of Chile and International Load Line Certificate. Its capacity is up to 106 passengers based on double occupancy, has 53 cabins distributed in 4 decks.

External links 
   Cruceros Skorpios  (Spanish)

References 

Cruise ships
1988 ships